The Syria national under-16 basketball team is a national basketball team of Syria, administered by the Syrian Basketball Federation.
It represents the country in international under-16 (under age 16) basketball competitions.

Competition record

FIBA Under-17 World Championship

FIBA Asia Under-16 Championship

FIBA Europe Under-16 Championship

Team

See also
Syria men's national basketball team
Syria men's national under-19 basketball team

References

External links
Archived records of Syria team participations

Syria national basketball team
Men's national under-16 basketball teams